Chris Stearns is an American politician who is a Democratic member of the Washington Legislature representing the State's 47th House district for position 2. He is a member of the Navajo nation. Before serving in the legislature, Stearns was the first tribal member to serve on the Auburn City Council.

Early life and career
Sterns graduated from Lawrenceville School. He earned a B.A. with honors in history from Williams College. He graduated with a Juris Doctor degree from Cornell Law School.

President Bill Clinton appointed Stearns as director of Indian affairs for the Department of Energy under Secretary Bill Richardson. Stearns served as chair of the Washington State Gambling Commission and a member of the City of Seattle's Human Rights Commission.

Stearns was elected to the Auburn City Council in 2019.

Elections

References

Democratic Party members of the Washington House of Representatives
Williams College alumni
21st-century American politicians
Living people
Navajo people
Cornell Law School alumni
Year of birth missing (living people)